The CMLL Día de Muertos (2018) (Spanish for "Day of the Dead") is a professional wrestling pay-per-view event, scripted and produced by the Mexican Lucha Libre promotion Consejo Mundial de Lucha Libre (CMLL). The show took place on November 2, 2018, in CMLL's main venue, Arena México, in Mexico City, Mexico and celebrated the Mexican Day of the Dead celebration. Many of the wrestlers working the show wore the traditional Día de Muertos face and body paint for the Día de Muerto event. From the fourth match on the losing wrestlers were be dragged to El Inframundo ("The Underworld"), a side entrance in the arena, by a group of wrestlers dressed up as minions of the ruler of the underworld.

As part of the show Sansón successfully defended the Rey del Inframundo ("King of the Underworld") championship that he won at the 2017 Día de Muertos show against challenger Templario. The main event was a Relevos increíbles (Miss-matched team match) where the technico (those that portray the "good guys") King Phoenix teamed with his brother Penta 0M and Último Guerrero, who are both rudos ("the bad guys"), losing to the team of Diamante Azul, L.A. Park, and Michael Elgin. The show featured four additional matches.

Production

Background
The October 31, 2014 Día de Muertos show was the first of Mexican professional wrestling promotion Consejo Mundial de Lucha Libre's Dia de los Muertos ("Day of the Dead") celebrations in 2014 and began a tradition of CMLL holding a major show to celebrate the Latin American holiday. As part of their Dia de los Muerte celebrations CMLL admitted all kids in costumes for free for the show. CMLL held a second Dia de los Muerte celebration on Sunday November 2 as well. Both shows included the Edcanes, CMLL's ring girls and various wrestlers dressed up in traditional Día de Muertos garb. In 2014, CMLL also turned the basement of Arena México into a haunted house attraction before each show. CMLL has held one or more shows to celebrate the holiday annually since 2014, with 2018 marking the fifth year in a row.

Storylines
The 2018 Dia de Muertos show features six professional wrestling matches scripted by CMLL with some wrestlers involved in scripted feuds. Wrestlers portray either heels (referred to as rudos in Mexico, those that play the part of the "bad guys") or faces (técnicos in Mexico, the "good guy" characters) as they perform.

At the 2017 Día de Muertos show, Sansón outlasted El Cuatrero, Diamante Azul, Forastero, Hechicero, Mistico, Soberano Jr. and Valiente in a torneo cibernetico elimination match to become the first ever Rey del Inframundo ("King of the Underworld"). While Sansón was given a championship belt to symbolize his victory it is not a championship, but a tournament trophy that is not defended outside of the annual tournament in the vein of CMLL's Leyenda de Plata or Leyenda de Azul tournaments. On the October 26, 2018 CMLL Super Viernes show 12 wrestlers competed in the first round of the 2018 Rey del Inframundo tournament, with Templario winning the match over a field that included Audaz, Black Panther, El Cuatrero, Esfinge, Flyer, Forastero, Guerrero Maya Jr., Kawato San, Tiger, Tritón, and Virus, thus qualifying for the final match against Sansón on November 2.

Matches

See also
2018 in professional wrestling

References

2018 in Mexico
2018 in professional wrestling
CMLL Día de Muertos
Events in Mexico City
November 2018 events in Mexico